Ice seal, or (in the Southern Hemisphere) pack-ice seal is a general term applied to any one of a number of pinniped species of the family Phocidae whose life cycle is completed largely on or about the sea ice of the Earth's polar regions.

The following are widely considered pagophilic or "ice-loving" species:

Subfamily Monachinae
Ross seal
Crabeater seal
Leopard seal
Weddell seal

Subfamily Phocinae
Bearded seal
Hooded seal
Harp seal
Ringed seal
Ribbon seal
Spotted seal or larga seal

Mammal common names